Meller–Zakomelsky is a Russian noble family.

The founder of the House was Johann Möller-Sakomelsky (Russian: Ivan), who was awarded the name in 1789 when he was made a baron.

Known members

 Ivan Möller-Sakomelsky (1725—1790), baron
 Pyotr Ivanovich Meller-Zakomelsky (1755—1823) (ru)
 Anna Petrovna Maykova (1798—1875) — Daughter-in-law of poet A. A. Maykova, brother of Nikolay
 Yegor Petrovich Meller-Zakomelsky (1798—?) — Landowner in Kharkov
 Pyotr Petrovich Meller-Zakomelsky (1806—1869) — Knight of St. George (1847)
 Vladimir Petrovich Meller-Zakomelsky (1807—1862) — Major-General
 Fyodor Vladimirovich Meller-Zakomelsky (1857—1905) — Captain
  Vladimir Fyodorovich Meller-Zakomelsky (1894—1962) — Married to Nataly Georgievna (1900—1995), daughter of Duke G. N. Leuchtenberg (ru)
 Vladimir Vladimirovich Meller-Zakomelsky (ru) (1863—1920) — Politician and businessman 
 Alexander Vladimirovich Meller-Zakomelsky (1898—1977), Nazi writer and Russian émigré
 Ivan Ivanovich Meller-Zakomelsky
 Nikolay Ivanovich Meller-Zakomelsky (ru) (1813—1887) — General-Adjutant, General of the Infantry 
 Alexander Nikolayevich Meller-Zakomelsky (1844—1928)
 Sergey Nikolayevich Meller-Zakomelsky (1848—1899) — Knight of St. George (1876)
 Yegor Ivanovich Meller-Zakomelsky (ru) (1767—1830) - Russian Cavalry officer, Commander of the Mariapol Hussars in 1809 during the Russian 'invasion' of Austrian Galicia.
 Fjodor Ivanovich Meller-Zakomelsky (ru) (1772—1848) — Governor of Mogilev, Cavalry leader
 Maria Ivanovna

See also
Meller-Zakomelsky

References

Russian noble families